For the Slavyansky District in Ukraine: Sloviansk Raion

Slavyansky District is an administrative district (raion), one of the thirty-eight in Krasnodar Krai, Russia. As a municipal division, it is incorporated as Slavyansky Municipal District. It is located in the west of the krai. Its administrative center is the town of Slavyansk-na-Kubani (which is not administratively a part of the district). Population:

Administrative and municipal status
Within the framework of administrative divisions, Slavyansky District is one of the thirty-eight in the krai. The town of Slavyansk-na-Kubani serves as its administrative center, despite being incorporated separately as an administrative unit with the status equal to that of the districts.

As a municipal division, the district is incorporated as Slavyansky Municipal District, with the Town of Slavyansk-na-Kubani being incorporated within it as Slavyanskoye Urban Settlement.

References

Notes

Sources

Districts of Krasnodar Krai
